Mesut Mert (born 18 March 1978) is a Bulgarian-born Canadian football coach and former player who serves as an assistant coach for HFX Wanderers and as head coach of the Saint Mary's University men's soccer team.

Playing career
Mert made his USL debut with the Calgary Mustangs but joined Montreal for the 2005 season after Calgary folded.

Coaching career
Mert was named Technical Director of Scotia SC on 22 September 2007. As of 2011, he continues as coach and player of Suburban FC's Senior A Premier Men's Division, in the Nova Scotia Soccer League.

On 3 March 2020, Mert joined Canadian Premier League side HFX Wanderers as an assistant coach under Stephen Hart.

Personal life
Mert was born in Bulgaria and is of Turkish ancestry.  He was brought up in Halifax.

References

External links
Profile of Mesut Mert

1978 births
Living people
Association football midfielders
Bulgarian footballers
Canadian soccer players
Footballers from Sofia
Bulgarian people of Turkish descent
Canadian people of Turkish descent
Bulgarian emigrants to Canada
Naturalized citizens of Canada
Calgary Mustangs (USL) players
Montreal Impact (1992–2011) players
Saint Mary's Huskies soccer players
USL First Division players
Canadian soccer coaches
HFX Wanderers FC non-playing staff
University and college soccer players in Canada